Hendrik Hagens (10 June 1900 – 8 February 1981) was a Dutch fencer. He competed in the team sabre event at the 1928 Summer Olympics.

References

External links
 

1900 births
1981 deaths
Dutch male sabre fencers
Olympic fencers of the Netherlands
Fencers at the 1928 Summer Olympics
Sportspeople from Utrecht (city)